The 13th Arabian Gulf Cup was held in Oman, in October 1996.

The tournament was won by Kuwait for the 8th time.

Iraq continued to be banned from the tournament because of invasion of Kuwait in 1990.

Tournament

The teams played a single round-robin style competition. The team achieving first place in the overall standings was the tournament winner.

Result

References

1996
1996 in Asian football
1996
1996–97 in Qatari football
1996–97 in Bahraini football
1996–97 in Saudi Arabian football
1996–97 in Kuwaiti football
1996–97 in Omani football
1996–97 in Emirati football